Havuzlu is a village in Bor district of Niğde Province, Turkey. The population of Havuzlu was 241 as of 2011. The village was founded on an old settlement (probably a part of ancient Tyana. According to one report the former name Baravun of the village means "dense forest" in old Turkish.

References 

Villages in Bor District, Niğde